Glyn Ivor Gething (16 June 1892 – 20 March 1977) was a Welsh international rugby union full back who played club rugby for Skewen and Neath and international rugby for Wales. He was a bank clerk by profession.

Rugby history
Gething first came to note as a rugby player when he represented Skewen RFC. By 1913 he had joined Neath, and it was during his time at the club that he was selected for his one and only international cap for Wales. Gething was chosen for the 1913 Five Nations Championship to face France, played away at Parc des Princes, in a close game which saw Wales win 11-8.

International matches played
Wales
 1913

Bibliography

References 

1892 births
1977 deaths
Welsh rugby union players
Wales international rugby union players
Rugby union fullbacks
Skewen RFC players
Neath RFC players
Rugby union players from Neath